Dowally is a village and parish in Perth and Kinross, Scotland.

The village has a parish church dedicated to St. Anne, it was constructed in 1818 and replaced a previous church which had been constructed around 1500 but fell into ruin by 1755. In 1861 the population was 486 by 1881 this had reduced to 431.

References

Villages in Perth and Kinross